is a manga series by Shuji Kishihara and Yasuharu Tomono serialized in Nakayoshi, about the lives of 48 puppies. An anime television series was produced based on the manga.

The main character's story presents the journey of the archetypal hero found in world mythologies and religions (the Monomyth), a theory developed by Joseph Campbell in his book The Hero with a Thousand Faces.

Plot
A French Bulldog is adopted from the Happy Kennel by a girl named Ai and is given the name Alex. She tells him stories and reads to him from a book titled The Adventures of Freddy about dog who leaves home to find the Fortune Tree.

However, he is separated from Ai when he mistakenly follows a girl wearing the same clothes as Ai on a bus. Adopting the name Freddy, after the hero in Ai's storybook, Alex begins his quest to return to Ai. But before he can return to his owner, Freddy and his new friends must find the Fortune Tree and save it from dying, otherwise all the humans in the world will lose their good will and no longer care about their pets.

Characters

Dogs

Alex/Freddy (フレディー) - A male French Bulldog. He embarked on a quest to return to Ai when he mistakenly followed a girl wearing the same clothes as Ai into a bus in episode 2. In episode 3, Alex took on the name Freddy, after the hero in Ai's story book titled The Adventures of Freddy, about a dog leaving home to find the Fortune Tree.
Shibata (シバタ) - Shiba Inu
Chibiyama (チビヤマ) - Chihuahua
Don Corocorone (ドン・コロコローネ) - A Bulldog, his owner is a thief.
Shina (シーナ) - Shih Tzu
Cammy (キャミー) - A female Cavalier King Charles Spaniel show dog Freddy met in episode 4. She was raised by humans who rarely let her to go outside. Dach showed affection over her, but left her in the end.
Pappy (パピー) - Papillon
Dach (ドッチ) - A male field Dachshund Alex met in episode 3. He was an expert digger, once owned by the human Jack. Dach taught Alex about interacting with humans. Freddy joined Dach's travel quest at the end of episode 3.
Max (マックス) - A male Boxer who had come from Happy Kennel, and had met Alex while both were still in the kennel. Although inexperienced as a guard dog, it has a strong sense of food. Its favourite food is milk. It was evicted by its owner in episode 8 after a male robber had broken into the same house twice, and the owner discovered Freddy, Dach, Max were inside the damaged house.
Lovely (ラブリー) - Labrador Retriever
Yoko (ヨーコ) - Yorkshire Terrier
Kowaruski (コワルスキー) - Weimaraner
Minich - (ミニッチ) Miniature Pinscher
Ryoma (リョウマ) - An old male Tosa who had grown up in mountains. Ryoma started to live in the wild when delivery truck that carries Ryoma to its customer crashed. He taught Freddy about being a wild dog, identifying and marking dog scents, circular patrolling. After losing a fight against Freezer, Ryoma told Freddy to leave, but Freddy found Ryoma in episode 6. At the end of episode 6, an old woman was identified to be Ryoma's owner. However, Ryoma felt betrayed by its owner when the owner was sick and could not take care of Ryoma while in hospital. When Ryoma's owner collapsed again in episode 6, Ryoma defeated Freezer on its way to the owner, and reunited with the owner at the end.
Bruto (ブルート) - Bulldog
Pochi (ポッチ) - Mixed-breed
Martaff (マータフ) - Doberman Pinscher. A male field dog in episode 4, with Osaka accent.
Rikyu (リキュー) - Akita Inu. Episode based on real Japanese Akita Hachikō.
Sanbe (サンペー) - Welsh Corgi Pembroke
Kinta (キンタ) - Golden Retriever
Jess (ジャズ) - Golden Retriever, Kinta's mother
Himechin (ヒメチン) - Japanese Chin
Daltian (ダルジャン) - A female Dalmatian from episode 6 with unidentified owner.
Poron - (ポロン) Pomeranian
B-chan - (ビーチャン) Beagle
Marco - (マルコ) Maltese
Arnest (アーネスト) - A female Afghan Hound Alex met in episode 2 outside bakery.
Leon (レオン) - Bloodhound
Pugbou (パグボー) - Pug, arrested by the police dogs, asks Freddy to help him
Mook (ムック) - A male Old English Sheepdog raised by Rogers in episode 9.
Eiji (エージ) - Male German Shepherd owned by Happy Kennel that used to work for police as sniffing dog, and always travel with Cammy.
Bright (ブライト) - Samoyed
Wang (ワン) - Chow Chow
Jackie (ジャッキー) - Jack Russell Terrier
Yubi (ユーピー) - A robot
Kosuke (コースケ) - Norwich Terrier, a police dog, pursues Corocorone's owner.
Zenji - (ゼンジー) Pekingese
Cocco (コッコ) - An American Cocker Spaniel.
Tomiko - (トミコ) Shar Pei
Noppe - (ノッペ) Bull Terrier
Kitchen (キッチン) - A male Rough Collie/Shetland Sheepdog from episode 6 with a male owner. In episode 7, Kitchen altered its owner for the collapsed Ryoma's owner after hearing Ryoma's call.
Bernadon (バーナードン) - St. Bernard
Wealthy (ウエルシー) - West Highland White Terrier
Freezer (フリーザー) - Siberian Husky, male dog that defeated Ryoma in a territorial fight in episode 5, but beaten by Ryoma in episode 7.
Airi (アイリ) - Irish Setter
Whity (ホワイティ) - A female Poodle in episode 9, owned by Rogers.
Shunaemon (シュナエモン) - Standard Schnauzer
Shetlan (シェトラン) - Shetland Sheepdog
Edgar (エドガー) - A Wire Fox Terrier that taught Freddy to get food by begging to sausage vendor in episode 6.
Mace (メース) - Great Dane owned by Happy Kennel that used to work for police as sniffing dog, and always travel with Grace.
Police Dog - Giant Schnauzer
Police Dog - English Pointer
Police Dog - English Pointer

Birds
Myna (九官鳥) - A bird that guarded bakery in episode 3.

Humans
Alex (アレックス) - Owner of Happy Kennel. In addition to selling dogs, he also visits the owners of the dogs he sold.
Ai-chan (愛ちゃん) - Freddy's adopter in episode 1.
Jack (ジャック) - Dooch's former human owner in episode 3. Jack is obsessed on taking any dog he sees to home.
Rogers (ロジャース) - Owner of Whitety, Mook, and Rogers farm, a farm for cows and sheep.

Cast
 Freddy - Yumiko Kobayashi
 Alice - Rie Satou
 Cocco - Chiaki Takashi
 Shibata- Akeno Watanabe
 B-Chan - Chika Sakamoto
 Max - Kouichi Toochika
 Chibiyama - Miwa Matsumoto
 Leon - Dai Matsumoto
 Pochi - Rica Matsumoto
 Bluto - Junichi Endou
 Rikyu - Cho
 Dach - Yuu Mizushima
 Kowalski - Shoto Kashii

External links
Fortune Dogs homepage
TV Tokyo's FD page
 

2002 anime television series debuts
Animated television series about dogs
Manga (year of release missing)
Comics about dogs
Kodansha manga